= D'Wäschfra (2010) =

- Language: Luxembourgish

D'Wäschfra was a satirical newspaper published in Luxembourg from 2010 to 2013.
